Galaxy Media (formerly Galaxy Communications) is a radio broadcasting company with radio stations entirely in the Central New York area.

History 
Ed Levine, current president, attended the Newhouse School at Syracuse University where his love for radio began. After serving as program director for the college radio station, Levine and two classmates started Syracuse’s first live FM radio station in 1978. In 1989, the first Galaxy station, WKLL was launched by the current CEO, Ed Levine, and his business partner, Bob Raide. WKLL was named for Ed and wife Pam’s then-19-month-old daughter Lauren. In the 1990s, Galaxy launched additional stations in Syracuse and Utica. In 2001, the headquarters was moved from Bridgeport to a new building in Armory Square, located in downtown Syracuse. WKLL remains owned by Galaxy to this day.

In 2016 Galaxy moved their Utica studios (WKLL, WUMX, WTLB and WRNY) from Washington Mills to Downtown Utica inside the brand new Landmarc building (the old HSBC location) and renamed it Galaxy Media in 2018.

Galaxy divested itself of its Albany, New York cluster and swapped several stations in a multi-owner deal that included Clear Channel Communications in Utica/Rome 2007.

In October 2016, Galaxy Communications (through Galaxy II Media, LLC) agreed to acquire Gamma Broadcasting's stations in Berkshire County, Massachusetts for $3.15 million: WBEC, WBEC-FM, and WUPE in Pittsfield, WNAW and WUPE-FM in North Adams, and WSBS in Great Barrington.

In 2018, Galaxy Communications rebranded to Galaxy Media company and brought aboard 10 new investors to buy out the shares that had been owned by a private investment firm and help the company reduce debt. Those investors are local people including Ed Levine's long-time friend and Syracuse University basketball coach Jim Boeheim. Additionally in 2018, Townsquare Media acquired the classic rock radio station WOUR-FM 96.9 in Utica from Galaxy Media in Q4.

Stations

Syracuse/Oswego
WTKW/WTKV - classic rock ("TK")
WKRL/WKRH - active rock ("K-Rock")
WZUN (Classic Hits)
WTLA/WSGO (ESPN Radio)
WZUN-FM - classic hits ("Sunny")

Utica/Rome
WKLL - active rock ("K-rock")
WTLB / WRNY (AM) (ESPN Radio)
WUMX - hot adult contemporary ("Mix")
WIXT - variety hits ("Tony FM")

Former
Several stations formerly in the Galaxy family were sold to the Educational Media Foundation.
 WOUR, Now owned by Townsquare Media.
 The Bone of Albany, NY: (WOOB and WBOE, now WYAI and WYKV respectively)
 WSCP-FM of Sandy Creek/Pulaski, NY (now WGKV)
 WRCK in Utica (now WKVU) - Swapped with WOUR
 WOKR: Remsen, NY (now WAWR)

References

External links 

 Galaxy Media

Mass media in Syracuse, New York
Radio broadcasting companies of the United States